Hynobius formosanus, the Taiwan salamander, is a species of salamander in the family Hynobiidae, endemic to Taiwan, where it occurs in the high mountains at around . Its natural habitats are from open alpine habitats to shaded moist evergreen forests.

See also
List of protected species in Taiwan
List of endemic species of Taiwan

References

formosanus
Amphibians described in 1922
Endemic fauna of Taiwan
Amphibians of Taiwan
Taxonomy articles created by Polbot